Rodell is an unincorporated community located in the town of Lincoln, Eau Claire County, Wisconsin, United States. The name of the community is an early 20th-century modification of Rosedale, the original name of the Chicago & North Western station.

Notes 

Unincorporated communities in Eau Claire County, Wisconsin
Unincorporated communities in Wisconsin